Oulad M'Hamed is a small town and rural commune in Settat Province of the Chaouia-Ouardigha region of Morocco. At the time of the 2004 census, the commune had a total population of 10844 people living in 1663 households.

References

Populated places in Settat Province
Rural communes of Casablanca-Settat